Tug of war is a sport that directly puts two teams against each other in a test of strength and stamina.

Tug of war may also refer to:

Film, television and stage
 Tug of War (2006 film), a short film by British director Scott Mann
 Tug of War (2021 film), a Tanzanian drama
 "Tug of War" (Upstairs, Downstairs), a 1974 episode of the television series Upstairs, Downstairs
 "Tug-o-War", an athletic event in the television series American Gladiators
 Tug of War, a 2007 play based on a translation of Plautus' Rudens

Astronomy
 Tug-of-war value, an informal value in astronomy originally suggested by author Isaac Asimov
 Tug of war (astronomy), the ratio of planetary and solar attractions on a natural satellite

Music

Albums
 Tug of War (Paul McCartney album), 1982
 Tug of War (Enchant album), 2003
 Tug of War (Carly Rae Jepsen album), 2008
 Tug of War (Colton Ford album), 2008

Songs
 "Tug of War" (Paul McCartney song)
 "Tug of War", a song by Ratt from the 1999 album Ratt
 "Tug-O-War", a song by Chevelle from their 2004 album This Type of Thinking (Could Do Us In)
 "Tug of War" (Carly Rae Jepsen song)
 "Tug of War", a song by Algebra from her album Purpose (2008)

See also
 Tug of War International Federation, the international governing body for the sport of tug of war